Carol Haley may refer to:

 Carol Louise Haley (born 1951), member of the Legislative Assembly of Alberta
 Carol Anne Haley (born 1972), member of the Newfoundland and Labrador House of Assembly